Zeina Awad is a Lebanese/Canadian news correspondent who used to co-host Fault Lines, Al Jazeera English's flagship current affairs programme about the Americas. Awad says she believes that Fault Lines strives to identify and patch information gaps by "asking the tough questions" of the countries and people in power.

Before joining Al Jazeera English, Awad was a producer for the BBC's HARDtalk and Panorama programmes (2004–2006), as well as Al Jazeera Arabic (2003–2004) and the Canadian Broadcasting Corporation (2000–2002). Later on, she left Al Jazeera in 2013, then joined TRT World from 2015 to 2017.

Beginnings
She studied bachelor at the McGill University, then earned a master's degree in Comparative Politics from the London School of Economics in November 2003.

Career

Fault Lines
Awad's Fault Lines coverage brought her to India where she reported on US pharmaceutical companies conducting clinical research abroad. She also traveled to Puerto Rico, projected to be the world's slowest growing economy, to analyze the economic policies imposed on its people. She rounds out this season's coverage with an exploration of the growing gap between the wealthiest 1% of Americans and the rest of society.

Awad says she believes that Fault Lines strives to identify and patch information gaps by "asking the tough questions" of the countries and people in power.

Other coverages
Prior to joining the Fault Lines team, Awad covered some of the Middle East and Africa's most important stories for Al Jazeera English's People and Power, including the rise of Islamism in Lebanon's Palestinian refugee camps, Iraq's forgotten refugees, and the underground world of Zimbabwean human trafficking. Based in the Middle East, Awad traveled throughout the region extensively, covering news stories ranging from the Gaza war to Lebanon's violent unrest. Awad's reporting also brought her to Africa, where her coverage spans the continent and focuses on issues such as the Darfur conflict and the Zimbabwean exodus.

Awad has reported from Syria, Lebanon, Israel, Jordan, the Occupied Palestinian Territories, South Africa, Kenya, Morocco, Algeria, Canada, the US and India. Awad has interviewed numerous world leaders, including former Nigerian President Obasanjo, Hamas Prime Minister Ismail Haniyeh, veteran Lebanese politician Walid Jumblatt and members of the US Congress, as well as Arab and African ministers.

References

Living people
Year of birth missing (living people)
Al Jazeera people
McGill University alumni
Alumni of the London School of Economics